"I'm Sorry If My Love Got in Your Way" is a single by American country music artist Connie Smith. Released in September 1971, the song reached #14 on the Billboard Hot Country Singles chart. Originally, "I'm Sorry If My Love Got in Your Way" was not released on an album, but in 1974 it was issued on Smith's compilation Connie Smith Now.

Chart performance

References

1971 singles
Connie Smith songs
Songs written by Dallas Frazier
Songs written by Sanger D. Shafer
Song recordings produced by Bob Ferguson (musician)
1971 songs
RCA Victor singles